MaKami College is a college in Edmonton and Calgary, Alberta. It was incorporated in Edmonton, Alberta in 2001. MaKami College is a provincially accredited private career college that trains students to become licensed massage therapists, health care aides, master instructors, security professionals, medical office assistants and business administration professionals. MaKami College also offers continuing education opportunities throughout the year, including English Language Arts (ELA), and a number of workshops for students as well as the general public.

History 

MaKami College started as a small vocational school in Edmonton, AB. Enrollment has grown to over 2,000 students per year.

In 2013, MaKami College opened a second campus in Calgary. In 2019, MaKami College's Edmonton campus moved into the Boonie Doon shopping centre, a 10,219-square-metre space formerly occupied by the department store Sears. In 2021, a second Calgary location was opened in the Marlborough Mall.

Campuses 

MaKami College's head office is located in a 110,000 sqft. space at the Bonnie Doon Shopping Centre, at the intersection of Whyte Avenue and 83 Street in the Bonnie Doon neighbourhood. 

The Calgary SW campus was opened in 2013.

Opened in August 2021, the Calgary NE campus is located in Marlborough Mall.

References

Universities and colleges in Edmonton
Vocational education in Canada
Universities and colleges in Calgary
Colleges in Alberta
Massage therapy